Thokkottu railway station (station code: TKOT) is a railway station serving Mangalore city, the second major city of Karnataka. It lies to the south of Mangalore city and in the Shoranur–Mangalore section of the Southern Railways. Trains halting at the station connect this region to prominent cities in India such as Thiruvananthapuram, Kochi, Chennai, Kollam, Bangalore, Kozhikode, Coimbatore, Mysore  and so forth. Station is now closed.

References

Railway stations in Dakshina Kannada district
Palakkad railway division